Ichiro Yoshikuni (September 2, 1916 - September 2, 2011) was a Japanese baseball executive. He served as the Commissioner of Baseball in Nippon Professional Baseball from 1989 to 1998. The longest-serving NPB commissioner, he is a member of the Japanese Baseball Hall of Fame.

External links
Japanese Baseball Hall of Fame

1916 births
2011 deaths
Nippon Professional Baseball commissioners